This is a list of all the American golfers who have played in the Arnold Palmer Cup through 2020. The Arnold Palmer Cup was known as the Palmer Cup until 2015.

Players

Women

Amari Avery 2022
Addie Baggarly 2020
Kaylee Benton 2019
Abbey Carlson 2019
Jennifer Chang 2019
Hailee Cooper 2019
Allisen Corpuz 2020, 2021
Jamie Freedman 2018
Mariel Galdiano 2018, 2019
Allyson Geer 2020
Kristen Gillman 2018
Haylee Harford 2019
Hanna Harrison 2021
Lauren Hartlage 2021
Rachel Heck 2022
Jaime Jacob 2020
Julia Johnson 2020, 2021
Gurleen Kaur 2022
Dylan Kim 2018, 2019
Gina Kim 2020, 2021
Irene Kim 2021
Rachel Kuehn 2020, 2021, 2022
Jennifer Kupcho 2018
Stephanie Lau 2019
Andrea Lee 2018
Antonia Malate 2022
Brooke Matthews 2021
Emilia Migliaccio 2018, 2019, 2020, 2021
Olivia Mitchell 2022
Anna Morgan 2022
Malia Nam 2019
Kaitlyn Papp 2018, 2019, 2020
Ann Parmerter 2019
Calynne Rosholt 2022
Megan Schofill 2020
Sophia Schubert 2018
Brooke Seay 2022
Erica Shepherd 2021, 2022
Kate Smith 2021
Lauren Stephenson 2018
Latanna Stone 2020, 2021, 2022
Alana Uriell 2018
Lilia Vu 2018
Kenzie Wright 2020
Rose Zhang 2022

Men

Anders Albertson 2015
Tyson Alexander 2010
Jeremy Anderson 1998, 1999
John Augenstein 2019, 2020
Ryan Baca 2006
Shintaro Ban 2018
Blayne Barber 2011, 2012
Derek Bard 2016
Zach Bauchou 2018
Sam Bennett 2021, 2022
Daniel Berger 2013
Ryan Blaum 2005, 2006
Dustin Bray 2003
Michael Brennan 2022
Jacob Bridgeman 2021
Jonathan Brightwell 2020
Sam Burns 2017
Jonathan Byrd 1999, 2000
Patrick Cantlay 2011
Alex Carpenter 2011, 2013
Nick Cassini 2000, 2001
Ricky Castillo 2020, 2021
Roberto Castro 2005, 2006
Bud Cauley 2009
Kevin Chappell 2008
John Chin 2010
David Chung 2010
Wyndham Clark 2014
Erik Compton 2001
Pierceson Coody 2020, 2021
John Coultas 2017
Sean Crocker 2017
Quade Cummins 2019, 2020
Ben Curtis 1999
Sean Dale 2013
Brad Dalke 2018
Charlie Danielson 2016
Bryson DeChambeau 2014
Alistair Docherty 2016
Jake Doggett 2022
Cooper Dossey 2020
Austin Eckroat 2019
Brad Elder 1997
John Engler 1999, 2000, 2001
James Erkenbeck 2013
Derek Ernst 2012
Matt Every 2004, 2005
Derek Fathauer 2008
Jack Ferguson 2004
Erik Flores 2009
Rickie Fowler 2008
Stephen Franken 2018
Nick Gabrelcik 2021, 2022
Doug Ghim 2016, 2017
Lucas Glover 2000, 2001
Aaron Goldberg 2008
Will Gordon 2016, 2019
Will Grimmer 2019
Bill Haas 2002, 2003
Chesson Hadley 2008
Brandon Hagy 2014
Ryan Hall 2021
Cole Hammer 2019
Nick Hardy 2017
Brian Harman 2006, 2007
Jason Hartwick 2003, 2004
Russell Henley 2010, 2011
J. J. Henry 1998
Rico Hoey 2014, 2016
Morgan Hoffmann 2009
J. B. Holmes 2005
Billy Horschel 2007, 2008
Beau Hossler 2015
Charles Howell III 1998
Brian Hull 1997
Billy Hurley III 2004
Ryan Hybl 2002
Palmer Jackson 2022
J. J. Jakovac 2004
Dustin Johnson 2007
Michael Johnson 2016
Stewart Jolly 2014
Kyle Jones 2015
Evan Katz 2020
Johnny Keefer 2022
Michael Kim 2013
Chris Kirk 2006, 2007
Jeff Klauk 2000, 2002
Joel Kribel 1997
Matt Kuchar 1998, 1999
Hank Kuehne 1998, 1999
Peter Kuest 2019
Doug LaBelle II 1998
Scott Lander 2001
Scott Langley 2010
Kevin Larsen 2006
S.M. Lee 2018
Walker Lee 2022
Trent Leon 2009
Spencer Levin 2005
Luke List 2006, 2007
Edward Loar 1998
Jamie Lovemark 2007
Anthony Maccaglia 2014
Brock Mackenzie 2002
Jack Maguire 2014, 2015
Hunter Mahan 2002
Patrick Martin 2019
Lee McCoy 2015
Maverick McNealy 2015, 2017
Dylan Menante 2021, 2022
Nahum Mendoza III 2016
Daniel Miernicki 2010, 2011
Andy Miller 2000
Corbin Mills 2012
Adam Mitchell 2008, 2009
Bryce Molder 1998, 1999, 2001
William Moll 2021
Jonathan Moore 2007
Ryan Moore 2003, 2004
Collin Morikawa 2017, 2018
Michael Morrison 1999
Trey Mullinax 2014
Corey Nagy 2010
Chris Nallen 2003, 2004
Trevor Norby 2021
Alberto Ochoa 1997
Clay Ogden 2006
Ted Oh 1997
Jeff Overton 2005
John Pak 2020
Chandler Phillips 2017, 2018, 2019
Trent Phillips 2021
Michael Putnam 2005
Jeff Quinney 2001
Jonathan Randolph 2010
Garett Reband 2020
Brad Reeves 2021
Davis Riley 2018
Patrick Rodgers 2012, 2013
Matthew Rosenfeld 2005
Adam Rubinson 2003
Andy Sanders 2000
Gordon Sargent 2022
Ollie Schniederjans 2014, 2015
Alex Scott 2019
Robby Shelton 2014, 2015
Cole Sherwood 2022
Benjamin Shipp 2021
Webb Simpson 2007
Alex Smalley 2019
Brandt Snedeker 2003
Jimmy Stanger 2017
Hunter Stewart 2015
Chris Stroud 2004
Justin Suh 2018
Sahith Theegala 2018
Justin Thomas 2012, 2013
Davis Thompson 2020
Michael Thompson 2008
Michael Thorbjornsen 2022
Braden Thornberry 2018
Peter Tomasulo 2003
D. J. Trahan 2002
Cameron Tringale 2009
Bo Van Pelt 1997
Mike Van Sickle 2009
Carr Vernon 2015
Travis Vick 2022
Arnond Vongvanij 2011
Charles Warren 1997
Nick Watney 2002
Michael Weaver 2013
James White 2012
Cory Whitsett 2013
Chris Williams 2011, 2012
Lee Williamson 2002
Chris Wisler 2000, 2001
Matthew Wolff 2018
Chris Wollmann 1997
Zach Wright 2016
Brandon Wu 2019
Bobby Wyatt 2013
Norman Xiong 2017
Andrew Yun 2011, 2012
Will Zalatoris 2016
Zach Zediker 2020
Steve Ziegler 2009

See also 

Golf in the United States
List of International Arnold Palmer Cup golfers
Lists of golfers

References

American
Arnold Palmer Cup
Arnold Palmer Cup
Arnold Palmer Cup
Golf
Arnold Palmer Cup, American